The Summoned Stakes is a Melbourne Racing Club Group 3  Thoroughbred horse race, raced under set weights with penalties conditions for mares aged four years old and upwards, over a distance of 1500 metres run at Sandown Racecourse, Melbourne, Australia in mid November. Prize money for the race is A$200,000.

History
The race is named after the mare Summoned, who bore five different Group winners. 

In 2013 the event was held at Caulfield Racecourse due to construction at Sandown Racecourse.

In 2021 the race was run at Caulfield Racecourse.

Grade
 1995–2012 - Listed race
 2013 onwards  - Group 3

Distance
 1995–2012 - 1500 metres
 2013 - 1600 metres
 2014 onwards - 1500 metres

Winners

 2022 - My Whisper
 2021 - Steinem
 2020 - Missile Mantra
 2019 - Jamaican Rain
 2018 - I'm A Princess
 2017 - Long Time Ago
 2016 - Silent Sedition
 2015 - Solicit
2014 - Politeness
2013 - Floria
2012 - Cabernet
2011 - Hi Belle
2010 - Happy Hippy
2009 - Dane Julia
2008 - Bernicia
2007 - Zip Baby Zip
2006 - Hasta La Ciao Ciao
2005 - Umber 
2004 - Tully Bellotto 
2003 - Irongail 
2002 - Bridal Hill  
2001 - Paris Heartbeat  
2000 - It's Platonic  
1999 - Rose Of Dane  
1998 - Cannyanna 
1997 - Vonanne 
1996 - Innocent Affair
1995 - Tolanda

See also
 List of Australian Group races
 Group races

References

Horse races in Australia